Svend Brinkmann is a Danish Professor of Psychology in the Department of Communication and Psychology at Aalborg University, Denmark. He serves as a co-director of the Center for Qualitative Studies. His research is particularly concerned with philosophical, moral, and methodological issues in psychology and other human and social sciences. In recent years, Svend Brinkmann has been studying the impact of psychiatric diagnoses on individuals and society.

Education 
Svend Brinkmann received his BA in philosophy in 1999 from Aarhus University. In 2000, he received his BSc in psychology. In 2002, Svend Brinkmann graduated as an MSc in psychology, and in 2006 he was awarded a PhD degree in psychology from Aarhus University.

Books 
Svend Brinkmann has been author or co-author on several books, many of which have been translated into English. A list of his books is presented below:

 John Dewey (2007) 
 Identitet (2008) 
 Psykens historier i Danmark (with Peter Triantafillou, 2008) 
 Psyken (2009) 
 Det diagnosticerede liv (2010) 
 Nye perspektiver på stress (with Malene Friis Andersen, 2013) 
 Kvalitativ udforskning af hverdagslivet (2013) 
 Det kvalitative interview (2014) 
 Stå fast (2014) 
 Kvalitative metoder (with Lene Tanggaard, 2015) 
 Interview (with Steinar Kvale, 2015, 3. udgave) 
 Diagnoser. Perspektiver, kritik og diskussion (with Anders Petersen, 2015) 
 Positiv og negativ psykologi (with Hans Henrik Knoop, 2016) 
 Selvrealisering (with Cecilie Eriksen, 2016) 
 Ståsteder (2016) 
 Gå Glip (2017) 
 The Joy of Missing Out: The Art of Self-Restraint in an Age of Excess (2019)

References

External links 
 

Danish psychologists
Living people
Aarhus University alumni
Academic staff of Aalborg University
1975 births